Alfred Davies  (1863 – 8 September 1932 ) was a Welsh international footballer. He was part of the Wales national football team between 1885 and 1890, playing 9 matches. He played his first match on 11  April 1885 against Ireland and his last match on 15  March 1890 against England. At club level, he played for Crewe Alexandra

See also
 List of Wales international footballers (alphabetical)

References

External links
 
 

1863 births
Welsh footballers
Wales international footballers
Crewe Alexandra F.C. players
Place of birth missing
1932 deaths
Association football defenders
Swifts F.C. players
Wrexham A.F.C. players